In Kristiansand, Norway, there are 4 older fortifications and 5 fortresses built around World War II, in addition to Odderøya who has both older and younger fortifications.

Sources 
Coastal Artillery at the Coast of Agder 1899-1999 (Kystartilleri ved Agder-kysten 1899-1999) www.agderkultur.no 
Fjørtoft, Jan Egil: Kanonene ved Skagerak, Agdin Forlag 1985. ,    

 
Forts in Norway